Mircești may refer to several places:

In Romania:

 Mircești, a commune in Iași County
 Mircești, a village in Tătulești Commune, Olt County
 Mircești, a village in Tăcuta Commune, Vaslui County
 Mirceștii Noi and Mirceștii Vechi, villages in Vânători Commune, Vrancea County
 Mircești, a former village in Ion Corvin Commune, Constanța County

In Moldova:

 Mircești, a village in Boghenii Noi Commune, Ungheni district